Asellia is a genus of bat in the family Hipposideridae. It contains the following species:
 Arabian trident bat (Asellia arabica)
 Somalian trident bat (Asellia italosomalica)
 Patrizi's trident leaf-nosed bat (Asellia patrizii)
 Trident bat (Asellia tridens)

References

 
Bat genera
Taxa named by John Edward Gray
Taxonomy articles created by Polbot